Over 90 parks and undeveloped sites are managed by the Parks & Recreation Department in Boise, Idaho, including 86 tennis courts, 48 soccer fields, 25 pickleball courts, 22 basketball courts, six bocce courts, three lacrosse fields, an archery range, and a cricket field. City parks also include more than 45,000 trees and 190 miles of trails covering over 4600 acres. The park system includes 11 reserves with 40 miles of trails on 4000 acres of habitat.

List of parks in Boise

See also

References

External links
 
 Ridge to Rivers
 Idaho Conservation League
 Boise Kid Friendly City Guide
 ParkScore 2018, The Trust for Public Land
 Treasure Valley parks guide, Idaho Statesman article

Further reading
 Bowen, Gordon S., Boise's Parks: A Cause and a Trust (Bowen, 2002)

Boise, Idaho
Parks in Idaho
Lists of parks in the United States by city